The Convent is a 2018 British horror film written by Paul Hyett and Conal Palmer, and directed by Hyett. The pair previously collaborated on the 2012 film The Seasoning House.

Synopsis
During the 17th Century, a young woman, Persephone, is saved from execution and led to a priory to repent her sins but discovers a greater evil lies within.

Cast
 Michael Ironside as The Magistrate
 Rosie Day as Sister Emeline
 Hannah Arterton as Persephone
 Dilan Gwyn as Alice Langley
 Clare Higgins as Reverend Mother
 Ciaran McMenamin as William Carpenter
 Ryan Oliva as The Diabolical
 Sian Breckin as Sister Lucilla
 Katie Sheridan as Sister Margaret
 Grahame Fox as Jeremiah
 Petra Bryant as Agnes
 Ania Marson as Sister Elizabeth
 Sarah Malin as Sister Anna Frances
 Emily Tucker as Catherine 
 Bethan Walker as Sister Bernadine
 Amelia Bennett as Sister Adela
 Freddy Carter as Ellis
 Ayvianna Snow as Sister Lillith
 Jill Buchanan as Guinevere
 Carl Wharton as Farmer
 Colin Burt Vidler as Constable
 Eva Morgan as Sister Constance

References

External links
 

Unreleased films
Cancelled films
British horror films
Films set in the 17th century